XHTEU-FM is a radio station on 99.1 FM in Tehuacán, Puebla. It is owned by Radiorama and carries its La Poderosa grupera format.

History
XHTEU received its concession on November 12, 1992. It was owned by Carlos Caballero Ávila. In 1999, ownership was transferred to Radio Oriental.

References

External links
La Poderosa 99.1 Twitter

Radio stations in Puebla